The following table presents a listing of Burundi's 18 provinces ranked in order of the total population of their communes as recorded in the 2008 census, taking into account the creation of Rumonge Province from parts of Bujumbura Rural and Bururi in March 2015.

See also
Provinces of Burundi
Geography of Burundi
List of Burundian provinces by area

References

Provinces, population